The Springfield Model 1840 was a flintlock
musket manufactured by the United States during the mid-19th century. The .69 caliber musket had a 42-inch (107 cm) barrel, an overall length of 58 inches (147 cm), and a weight of 9.8 pounds (4.4 kg). More than 30,000 were produced by the Springfield and Harpers Ferry armories and two independent contractors between 1840 and 1846 (D. Nippes and L. Pomeroy).

The Model 1840 was a minor improvement over the Springfield Model 1835, and therefore was not dramatically different from the older musket. The Model 1840 featured a longer bayonet with a clasp and a stock with a comb. The designers of the Model 1840 anticipated that the musket would eventually be rifled, and made the barrel heavier than the earlier Model 1835 accordingly. The various modifications to the Model 1840 made it slightly heavier than the Model 1835.

The Model 1840 was the last flintlock musket produced at Springfield and Harpers Ferry armories. Many were converted to percussion lock before they made it to the field. Although produced as a smoothbore musket, most of the Model 1840s had their barrels rifled later, as the designers had anticipated.

See also
 Springfield musket

References

External links

Springfield firearms
Muskets
American Civil War weapons
Weapons of the Confederate States of America